Fatehah Mustapa (born 12 March 1989 in Terengganu) is a retired Malaysian track cyclist.

She competed in the keirin race at the 2012 Summer Olympics, where she placed 15th.

At the 2014 Commonwealth Games, she reached the bronze medal race in the women's sprint which she lost 2–0 to Jess Varnish.  She also finished 5th in the women's 500 m time trial.

At the 2016 Olympics, she competed in the women's sprint. She finished at 21st place in qualification round.

Major results

2007
3rd 500m Time Trial SEA Games
3rd Women Sprint SEA Games
2011
1st 500m Time Trial SEA Games
2012
1st Keirin Asian Cycling Championships
2nd Sprint Asian Cycling Championships
3rd Time Trial 500m Asian Cycling Championships
3rd Sprint Grand Prix von Deutschland
3rd Keirin Grand Prix von Deutschland
2013
1st Sprint Asian Cycling Championships
1st Keirin Asian Cycling Championships
3rd Time Trial 500m Asian Cycling Championships
1st Sprint Southeast Asian Grand Prix
1st Time Trial 500m Southeast Asian Grand Prix
3rd Keirin, Melbourne Cup on Wheels
2014
1st Sprint, South East Asian GP Track (2)
South East Asian GP Track (3)
1st Keirin
2nd Sprint
2nd Keirin 3rd round 2013-2014 UCI Track Cycling World Cup
2nd  Keirin, Asian Games
South East Asian GP Track (1)
2nd Keirin
2nd Sprint
2nd Keirin, Cottbuser Nächte
3rd  500m Time Trial, Asian Track Championships
3rd Keirin, Austral
2015
Japan Track Cup
1st Keirin
1st Sprint
1st Sprint
South East Asian GP Track
1st Keirin
1st Keirin
1st Sprint
1st Sprint
Asian Track Championships
2nd 500m Time Trial
3rd Sprint
2017
3rd Keirin, ITS Melbourne - Hisense Grand Prix 
Austral
3rd Keirin
3rd Sprint

References

1989 births
Living people
People from Terengganu
Malaysian Muslims
Malaysian people of Malay descent
Malaysian female cyclists
Olympic cyclists of Malaysia
Cyclists at the 2012 Summer Olympics
Cyclists at the 2016 Summer Olympics
Asian Games medalists in cycling
Cyclists at the 2010 Asian Games
Cyclists at the 2014 Asian Games
Cyclists at the 2014 Commonwealth Games
Commonwealth Games competitors for Malaysia
Asian Games silver medalists for Malaysia
Medalists at the 2014 Asian Games
Southeast Asian Games medalists in cycling
Southeast Asian Games gold medalists for Malaysia
Southeast Asian Games bronze medalists for Malaysia
Competitors at the 2007 Southeast Asian Games
Competitors at the 2011 Southeast Asian Games